TRP or Trp may refer to:

 Target rating point, for TV rating
 TransCanada Corporation

Science and health

 Total radiated power, related to antenna gain 
 Tryptophan, an amino acid abbreviated as Trp or W
 Transient receptor potential channel or TRP channel of a biological cell
 Traumatic reticuloperitonitis, veterinary medicine

Culture

 Theatre in the Round Players, Minneapolis, Minnesota, US
 Time Reading Program, Time Life, 1960s

Other

 Transition relevance place in conversation analysis